Two ships of the Royal Navy have borne the name HMS Jewel :

 was a 38-gun fifth rate, formerly the French frigate Topaze captured in 1809 initially named Jewel but renamed Alcmene later that year. She was broken up in 1816.
 was an  launched in 1944 and broken up  in 1967.

Royal Navy ship names